Samuel Mayes Arnell (May 3, 1833 – July 20, 1903) was an American lawyer and politician who represented the 6th congressional district of Tennessee in the United States House of Representatives. He was a staunch Unionist and served as a Republican. He had owned slaves. He later served as school superintendent and postmaster. He wrote a memoir.

Early life
He was born on May 3, 1833 at Zion Settlement, near Columbia, Tennessee in Maury County. He attended Amherst College in Amherst, Massachusetts, studied law, was admitted to the bar, and commenced practice in Columbia. He started a leather manufacturing business in 1859. He owned slaves.  During the Civil War, he supported the Union actively, suffering injury, threats to his life, and property damage from Confederate forces.

Political offices
He was a member of the Tennessee state constitutional convention in 1865. He served in the Tennessee House of Representatives in 1865 and 1866, where he authored a series of bills to expand voting rights to former slaves and that attempted unsuccessfully to strip the voting rights of former Confederate soldiers and officials for periods of 5 and 15 years, respectively; however, the definitions used to expand rights to blacks are seen by some historians as also having established an early version of the "one-drop" rule in Tennessee law.

Upon the readmission of Tennessee to representation, he was elected as an Unconditional Unionist to the Thirty-ninth Congress. He was re-elected as a Republican to the Fortieth and Forty-first Congresses. He served from July 24, 1866 to March 3, 1871, but he was not a candidate for renomination in 1870. During the Forty-first Congress, he was the chairman of the Committee on Expenditures in the Department of State. He was chairman of the United States House Committee on Education and Labor during the Forty-first Congress.  He also was a delegate to the Republican National Convention from Tennessee in 1868.

Private citizen
He resumed the practice of law in Washington, D.C., then later returned to Columbia, Tennessee. He was the postmaster of Columbia from 1879 to 1885. He was the superintendent of public schools from 1885 to 1888.  Near the end of his life, he authored his memoirs, "‘Ten Years of Tennessee History’ or ‘The War of Secession and Reconstruction in Tennessee, 1861-1871.’"

He died on July 20, 1903 in Johnson City, Tennessee in Washington County. He was interred in Monte Visa Cemetery.

References
This article incorporates facts obtained from the public domain Biographical Directory of the United States Congress.

External links

1833 births
1903 deaths
People from Maury County, Tennessee
Unconditional Union Party members of the United States House of Representatives from Tennessee
Republican Party members of the United States House of Representatives from Tennessee
Republican Party members of the Tennessee House of Representatives
Tennessee lawyers
American slave owners
People from Columbia, Tennessee
Amherst College alumni
Southern Unionists in the American Civil War